, also known as , is a manga artist.

He is the artist of Super Mario Adventures.

Video games

Character Design
 Dungeon Land
 Pikiinya!
 Sansara Naga
 Tower Dream

References

External links

 
 
 Charlie's blog

1961 births
Living people
Manga artists from Tokyo
People from Tokyo